The International Society for the Study of Individual Differences (ISSID) is a scientific society founded in 1983. According to its by-laws, the Society exists to "foster research on individual differences in temperament, intelligence, attitudes and abilities". Its members also study mood, emotion, and motivation as well as applications of individual differences in industrial and organizational psychology, clinical psychology, educational psychology, medicine, health and other areas. Its first president (and one of its founders) was Hans Eysenck. and the current president (2021-2023) is Colin Cooper from Queen's University Belfast.

References

External links
ISSID official site.

International scientific organizations
Psychology organizations